The  are presented every year by the Mystery Writers of Japan. They honor the best in crime fiction and critical/biographical work published in the previous year.

MWJ Award for Best Novel winners (1948–1951, 1976–present)

MWJ Award for Best Short Story winners (1948–1951, 1976–present)

MWJ Award for Best Critical/Biographical Work winners (1976–present) 
 MWJ Award for Best Work (1952–1975) winners for their Critical Work
 05 (1952) - EDOGAWA Rampo, Gen'ei-jo (Studies on detective fiction)
 19 (1966) - Kawataro Nakajima, Suiri Shosetsu Tembo (Studies on detective fiction)

MWJ Award for Best Work winners (1952–1975)

Nominees available in English translation
 Nominees for Best Novel
 02 (1949) - Akimitsu Takagi, 
 37 (1984) - Kenzo Kitakata, 
 42 (1989) - Joh Sasaki, 
 65 (2012) - Mahokaru Numata, 
 Nominees for Short Story
 56 (2003) - Otsuichi,  (A chapter of the Novel Goth)
 60 (2007) - Gaku Yakumaru (ja),  (Gaku Yakumaru, A Cop's Eyes, Vertical, 2016)
 63 (2010) - Shunsuke Nagase (ja), Ellery Queen's Mystery Magazine, February 2013

Other awards 
 MWJ Award for new face
 01 (1948) - Shigeru Kayama (ja),  (Short story)
 MWJ Award for encouragement
 07 (1954) - Jojiro Okami (ja),  (Novel)
 07 (1954) - Ro Hikawa (ja),  (Short story)
 07 (1954) - Saburo Washio,  (Short story)

See also 
 Edogawa Rampo Prize
 Japanese detective fiction
 Edgar Award
 Daggers
 Honkaku Mystery Award

References 
 Suekuni, Yoshimi (2000), "Nihon Suiri Sakka Kyōkai Shō". Nihon Misuteri Jiten(日本ミステリー事典), Shinchosha, Tokyo

External links 
 Mystery Writers of Japan
 Mystery Writers of Japan official English site
 List of Mystery Writers of Japan Award winners
 J'Lit Books from Japan| Awards: Mystery Writers of Japan Award

Mystery and detective fiction awards
Japanese literary awards
Awards established in 1948
1948 establishments in Japan